Ann Jebb (née Torkington; 1735–1812) was an English political reformer and radical writer. She was born at Ripton-Kings, Huntingdonshire, to Dorothy Sherard (herself daughter of Philip Sherard, 2nd Earl of Harborough) and James Torkington (a Church of England vicar.) She grew up in Huntingdonshire and was probably educated at home. She married religious and political reformer John Jebb in 1764 and fully shared his ideals. When they were first married he was lecturing at Cambridge, and she developed a reputation in university circles. Anne Plumptre was among her friends. Her writing often took the form of letters, signed with the nom de plume "Priscilla", such as the series she wrote to the London Chronicle (1772–4) during the movement of 1771 to abolish university and clerical subscription to the Thirty-nine Articles. Subsequently, in 1775, John Jebb resigned his church living, with the full support of Ann; John studied medicine and the couple later moved to London, where they were involved with a number of reformist causes such as the expansion of the franchise, opposition to the war with America, support for the French Revolution, abolitionism, and an end to legal discrimination against Roman Catholics. After she was widowed in 1786, she remained in London and continued to be politically active. Never robust, she died in 1812 and was buried with her husband.

Her writing appeared in the London Chronicle, the Whitehall Evening Post and the Monthly Repository, as well as in pamphlets and tracts. Often attacked for her politics, she has the distinction of having been mentioned by Richard Polwhele in The Unsex'd Females.

Resources 
Blain, Virginia, et al., eds. "Jebb, Ann." The Feminist Companion to Literature in English. New Haven and London: Yale UP, 1990. 572.
Gascoigne, John. "Jebb, John (1736–1786)." Oxford Dictionary of National Biography. Ed. H. C. G. Matthew and Brian Harrison. Oxford: OUP, 2004. Online ed. Ed. Lawrence Goldman. Oct. 2005. 7 May 2007.
Hole, Robert. "Hallifax, Samuel (1733–1790)." Oxford Dictionary of National Biography. Ed. H. C. G. Matthew and Brian Harrison. Oxford: OUP, 2004. 7 May 2007.
Page, Anthony.  "'A Great Politicianess': Ann Jebb, rational dissent and politics in late eighteenth-century Britain", Women's History Review, 17:5 (2008), pp. 743–765
Page, Anthony. John Jebb and the Enlightenment Origins of British Radicalism. Praeger Publishers, 2003.

References

External links

18th-century British women writers
1735 births
1812 deaths
Sherard family
18th-century English writers
English women writers
People from Huntingdonshire
18th-century English women
18th-century English people